BatterUP is a "24-inch foam-covered plastic" baseball bat-shaped controller manufactured for the personal computer, Sega Genesis, and the Super Nintendo Entertainment System by Sports Sciences Inc.

Compatible Super NES games
Cal Ripken Jr. Baseball, 1992 Mindscape
ESPN Baseball Tonight, 1994 Sony Imagesoft
Hardball III, 1994 Accolade
Ken Griffey Jr. Presents Major League Baseball, 1994 Nintendo
Ken Griffey, Jr.'s Winning Run, 1996 Nintendo
MLBPA Baseball, 1994 EA Sports
Sports Illustrated: Championship Football & Baseball, 1993 Malibu Games
Tecmo Super Baseball, 1994 Tecmo
Super Batter Up, 1993 Namco

Compatible Sega Genesis games
Sports Talk Baseball, 1992 Sega
World Series Baseball, 1994 Sega
Hardball III, 1993 Accolade
Hardball '94, 1994 Accolade
RBI Baseball '93, 1993 Tengen
RBI Baseball '94, 1994 Tengen
Cal Ripken Jr. Baseball, 1992 Mindscape
ESPN Baseball Tonight, 1994 Sony Imagesoft
Super Baseball 2020, 1993 Electronic Arts
Tony La Russa Baseball, 1993 EA Sports
MLBPA Baseball, 1994 EA Sports

Reception
According to Business Wire, "the video version of Batter Up was chosen by the editors of Popular Science as one of 1994's most innovative products. Batter Up was also chosen as a winner of Innovations '95 by the Consumer Electronics Show."

See also
 Super Scope
 Wii Remote

References

External links
Batter Up!

Nintendo controllers
Super Nintendo Entertainment System accessories
Sega Genesis
Computer-related introductions in 1994